Papyrus 81 (in the Gregory-Aland numbering), designated by 𝔓81, is an early copy of the New Testament in Greek. It is a papyrus manuscript of the First Epistle of Peter. The surviving texts of 1 Peter are verses 2:20-3:1,4-12. The manuscript paleographically has been assigned to the 4th century.

 Text 
The Greek text of this codex probably is a representative of the Alexandrian text-type. Aland placed it in Category II.

 Location 
It is currently housed at the Property S. Daris (№ 20) in Trieste.

See also 

 List of New Testament papyri

References

Further reading 

 S. Daris, Un nuovo frammento della prima lettera di Pietro, Papyrologica Castroctaviana. Studia et Textus 2 (Barcelona: 1967), pp. 11–37. 
 K. Junack and W. Grunewald, Das Neue Testament auf Papyrus: I Die Katholischen Briefe, Arbeiten zur neutestamentlichen Textforschung VI (Berlin/New York, 1986).

New Testament papyri
4th-century biblical manuscripts
First Epistle of Peter papyri